Mohamed Hicham Chérif (born 1 January 1992 in Oran) is an Algerian footballer who plays for USM Annaba in the Algerian Ligue Professionnelle 2.

Club career
Hicham Chérif was formed in MC Oran, he start in the senior first division in the 2009–10 season.

External links
 
 Hicham Chérif at Footballdatabase

1992 births
Living people
Footballers from Oran
Algerian footballers
Association football forwards
MC Oran players
USM Blida players
Algerian Ligue Professionnelle 1 players
21st-century Algerian people